DRNH is a Czech architectural studio established in 1991 in Brno. It was founded by architects Antonín Novák and Petr Valenta. The studio focuses on issues of the relationship between landscape and building, city and building not only in relation to environmental aspects of construction. DRNH has won numerous Czech architectural awards.

Projects 

 Reconstruction of the riding hall of the Lednice Castle, Lednice, 2012
 The National Centre of Garden Culture in Kroměříž, 2012, (nominated for 2013 Building of the Year)
 Indoor Swimming Pool in Litomyšl, 2010
 Apartment house, Brno, 2010
 Residential complex "Na Krutci" (with Kuba - Pilař architects), 2008, Praha
 Home for the elderly in Brno, 2006 
 Reduta Theatre reconstruction, 2005, Brno (won the Building of the Year award (2006) and Grand Prix of the Society of Czech Architects - National Architecture Award (2006))
 Restoration of former Wannieck Factory Production Hall for Wannieck Gallery, 2005, Brno
 Reconstruction and Extension of the Kraví Hora Recreation and Sports Facility, 2004, Brno
 Apotheke - Renewal of St. Kunhuta's Chapel, 2002, Brno
 Apartment house, Brno, 2003
 Head-office of public transport company DPMB (with RAW Architects), Brno, 2001
 Reconstruction of Jiří Mahen Library in Brno, 2001

Awards 
 2004 - Main Prize in the competition Swimming Pool of the Year (2004) in the Czech Republic for reconstruction and extension of the Kraví Hora Recreation and Sports Facility
 2005 - Main Prize Grand Prix OA (Grand Prix of the Society of Czech Architects) for Reconstruction and Extension of the Kraví Hora Recreation and Sports Facility
 2005 - Main prize in the 3rd annual competition Building with Environmental Benefits in the Czech Republic for reconstruction and extension of the Kraví Hora Recreation and Sports Facility
 2006 - Grand Prix OA in category reconstruction for Reconstruction of Reduta Theatre
 2006 - Building of the Year for Reconstruction of Reduta Theatre
 2011 - Building of the Year for Indoor Swimming Pool, Litomyšl
 2012 - Grand Prix OA in category new building for Indoor Swimming Pool, Litomyšl
 2013 - Grand Prix OA honorable mention in category new building for Gardening center of Kroměříž Archbishop's Palace
 2013 - title Architect of the Year 2013 in Czech Republic for Antonín Novák

Bibliography

References

External links 
Official website 

1991 establishments in Czechoslovakia
Architecture firms of the Czech Republic
Companies based in Brno
Design companies established in 1991